Iditarod: Toughest Race on Earth is a 2008 American reality television miniseries on the Discovery Channel that featured the 2008 Iditarod Trail Sled Dog Race from Anchorage to Nome, Alaska.

Overview
The show follows and documents selected racers and their dogs during the  trek through Alaska's wilderness. Iditarod entrants pay $3,000 to enter the race and must have completed certain qualifying races beforehand. Expenses for the race can exceed $20,000 and mushers often seek sponsors to aide in paying for the race. Most mushers hold outside jobs in addition to racing.

During the course of the show, it is shown how the logistics of running an Iditarod are handled. Supplies are gathered and then flown into each of the checkpoints usually just hours before the mushers arrive. Each musher is required to sign into each checkpoint and then decides if they are going to continue on or rest for several hours. Some mushers elect to take short stops, briefly feeding their dogs before continuing on the trail. Veterinarians perform constant examinations on the dogs at checkpoints throughout the race, and any injured or sick dogs are taken off of the team and then flown to Anchorage for proper care.

During the race, only three rest points are mandatory: one 24-hour and two 8-hour rests. Apart from that, mushers usually try to feed their dogs at each checkpoint, even if it is just as snack, as the dogs can burn around 10,000 calories a day.

Episodes

Reception
Common Sense Media rated the show 4 out of 5 stars.

References

External links
Official Iditarod Site

2000s American reality television series
2008 American television series debuts
2008 American television series endings
Discovery Channel original programming
Television series by Original Productions
Television shows set in Alaska
Iditarod